Jacques Pinsum (Habas, 27 September 1760 – 10 November 1808) was a French naval officer.

Career
In 1806, he captained the frigate Thétis, taking part in the action of 25 September 1806. He was killed in the action of 10 November 1808 while trying to board HMS Amethyst.

Sources and references

Notes

References

Bibliography

 Fonds Marine. Campagnes (opérations ; divisions et stations navales ; missions diverses). Inventaire de la sous-série Marine BB4. Tome premier : BB4 1 à 482 (1790-1826) 
 
 
 

French Navy officers
1767 births
French naval commanders of the Napoleonic Wars
1811 deaths
French military personnel killed in the Napoleonic Wars